Elizabeth Lowys (died 30 March 1565), was an English woman executed for witchcraft.  She is known as the first woman to be executed for witchcraft in England after the passing of the Witchcraft Act 1563.

She was married to the farmer John Lowys of Chelmsford, and was active as a cunning woman. In April 1564, she was accused of having caused the death of the baby Robert Wodley of Chelmsford and the child John Canall of Colchester by use of witchcraft. She was sentenced to death for murder by magic in June 1564. Her execution was postphoned because she falsely claimed to be pregnant.

References

 Carole Levin, Anna Riehl Bertolet, Jo Eldridge Carney, A Biographical Encyclopedia of Early Modern Englishwomen: Exemplary Lives 
 Diane Purkiss, The Witch in History: Early Modern and Twentieth-Century Representations

1565 deaths
Witch trials in England
16th-century English women
16th-century English people
Executed English women
People executed for witchcraft
Cunning folk